Sir John Julius Wells CBE  (30 March 1925 – 8 February 2017) was a British Conservative politician.

Life before politics
Wells was educated at Eton College and Corpus Christi College, Oxford (MA). He served in the Royal Naval Volunteer Reserve during the Second World War, as a seaman in 1942, commissioned in 1943 and in submarines until 1946. He was a marine engineer, company director and farmer, and was a councillor on Leamington Spa Borough Council.

Political career
At the 1955 general election, Wells stood unsuccessfully in the Smethwick constituency. At the 1959 general election, he was elected as the Member of Parliament (MP) for Maidstone, following in the footsteps of a 19th-century ancestor, also John Wells. He held the safe Conservative seat until his retirement at the 1987 general election, when his successor was the future minister Ann Widdecombe.

Throughout his period as a Member of Parliament, Wells was a strong supporter of country interests and the local economy, on one occasion riding his horse through the streets of Westminster and on another loudly eating a Kentish apple during a speech by a Labour Minister of Agriculture, as a protest against the import of cheap, subsidised and, in his opinion, inferior imports from France. He was appointed to the speaker's panel of chairmen in 1974, becoming senior Chairman of Standing Committees in 1983 until his retirement. He became chairman of the Horticultural Sub-Committee of the Select Committee on Agriculture in 1968 and was Master of the Worshipful Company of Fruiterers in 1977. He was made a Knight Bachelor in 1984 and appointed a Deputy Lieutenant of Kent in 1992.

Personal life
Wells married in 1948, Lucinda, eldest daughter of Francis R Meath Baker, of Hasfield Court, Gloucestershire. In 1958 the family moved to Mere House in Mereworth, Kent. The house had been built in the 18th century by Sir Francis Dashwood, a distant ancestor of Lucinda. The Wells family have themselves had a long association with West Kent dating back to at least the 16th century, and were mentioned by Samuel Pepys in his famous diary as owners of a successful shipbuilders on the Thames. Together the Wellses had two sons (WA Andrew, High Sheriff of Kent in 2005–06, and Oliver) and two daughters (the late Julia, Mrs James Luard, and Henrietta, homeopathic practitioner and author). Lady Wells died on 24 February 2013. Wells was a freemason.

References

The Times Guide to the House of Commons, Times Newspapers Ltd, 1955, 1966 & 1983

External links 
 
 Burke's Landed Gentry, 18th edn, vol 1 (1965) and vol 3 (1972)

1925 births
2017 deaths
Conservative Party (UK) MPs for English constituencies
Councillors in Warwickshire
People educated at Eton College
Royal Navy officers
Alumni of Corpus Christi College, Oxford
Commanders of the Order of the British Empire
Deputy Lieutenants of Kent
Knights Bachelor
UK MPs 1959–1964
UK MPs 1964–1966
UK MPs 1966–1970
UK MPs 1970–1974
UK MPs 1974
UK MPs 1974–1979
UK MPs 1979–1983
UK MPs 1983–1987
Royal Naval Volunteer Reserve personnel of World War II
Deaths from falls
Freemasons of the United Grand Lodge of England
Royal Navy sailors
People from Mereworth